= Ikole Botuli-Bolumbu =

Congolese poet

Ivonne Marie Claire Botuli-Bolumbu, known as Ikole Botuli-Bolumbu (born 1951) is a poet from the Democratic Republic of the Congo.

== Life ==
Botuli-Bolumbu was born in Kinshasa in 1951. She was a journalist and editor at the literary journal Dombi: Revue congolaise des lettres et des arts, published by the National Office of Research and Development in Kinshasa. She published several of her poems in Dombi.

== Works ==
- 'Evidence', Dombi, vol. 2 (September–October 1970), p.2
- Feuilles d'olive. Kinshasa; Lubumbashi: Éditions du Mont Noir, 1972. OCLC 1103287080
- 'Rendez-vous', 'Portrait d'une sentence', Dombi, vol. 4 (March–April 1972), p.291.
- 'Poemes', in M. N. Mabelemadiko, ed., Le Zaire ecrit: anthologie de la poesie zairoise de langue francoise, Tubingen: H. Erdmann Verlag, pp.230–232
- Reflets. 1984?
